Requiem is the seventh studio album by Swedish extreme metal band Bathory. It eschews the Viking metal style of Bathory's three previous releases for a thrash metal style that recalls many of the bands that initially influenced Bathory. This album marks the return of Bathory after Quorthon put the band on hold to record his first solo album.

Track listing

Personnel 

 Quorthon – guitar, vocals
 Kothaar – bass guitar
 Vvornth – percussion, drums

References 

Bathory (band) albums
1994 albums
Thrash metal albums by Swedish artists